Drypetis (died 323 BCE; sometimes Drypteis) was the daughter of Stateira I and Darius III of Persia. Drypetis was born between 350 and 345 BCE, and, along with her sister Stateira II, was a princess of the Achaemenid dynasty.

Capture and marriage
When Darius III began a military campaign against the invading army of Alexander the Great, he was accompanied by Drypetis, along with her sister, her mother, and her grandmother Sisygambis. Following the Battle of Issus in 333 BCE, Darius fled and his family was captured by Macedonian troops. Alexander personally met with the women and promised to provide dowries for Drypetis and Stateira.

Although Darius tried repeatedly to ransom his family, Alexander kept them with him until 331 BCE when Drypetis and her sister were sent to Susa to learn the Greek language.

In the spring of 324 BCE, Drypetis was married to Hephaestion, a general in Alexander's army, during the Susa weddings. Soon after, Drypetis was widowed when Hephaestion accompanied Alexander to Ecbatana and upon arriving in autumn, died after falling ill with a severe fever.

Death
Many historians accept Plutarch's account that Drypetis was killed in 323 BCE alongside her sister Stateira. Alexander had died earlier that year, and his other widow, Roxana, wished to remove her potential rivals.

Alternatively, historian Elizabeth Donnelly Carney claims that Drypetis was not killed by Roxana as Drypetis would not have borne a child by Alexander and as such, would have been of little threat to Roxana's position. Instead, Carney theorizes that Roxana killed Parysatis II (daughter of Artaxerxes III of Persia), who was likely also a wife of Alexander.

Portrayals of Drypetis in fiction
 Drypetis is one of the main characters in Stephanie Thornton's 2015 novel The Conqueror's Wife.
 Indian actress Shalini Sharma plays the character of Drypetis in the 2017 Indian TV series Porus.

Notes

References

Ancient sources
Arrian, The Campaigns of Alexander

Modern sources

External links
Dictionary of Greek and Roman Biography and Mythology
Drypetis, daughter of Darius and wife of Hephaestion in Pothos.org

323 BC deaths
4th-century BC women
People associated with Alexander the Great
Murdered royalty
Women in Hellenistic warfare
People who died under the regency of Perdiccas
Achaemenid princesses
Year of birth unknown
4th-century BC Iranian people
Women in ancient Near Eastern warfare
Darius III